Chahar Cheshmeh-ye Nazem (also Romanized as Chahār Cheshmeh-ye Nāz̧em; also known as Chahār Cheshmeh) is a village in Japelaq-e Gharbi Rural District, Japelaq District, Azna County, Lorestan Province, Iran. At the 2006 census, its population was 195, in 41 families.

References 

Towns and villages in Azna County